Dreams of the Carrion Kind is an album released by American death metal guitarist James Murphy, under the band name Disincarnate. It was released in 1993.

History
Dreams of the Carrion Kind, Disincarnate's only album ever, was released in 1993, near the zenith of the Florida death metal scene, through Roadrunner Records. It was reissued on February 24, 2004 with bonus tracks.

Music
The album stands out for its inaccessible sounds and sheer technique. Most of its tracks feature complex structures and constant riff and tempo changes. It features strong riffs, sledgehammer percussion from Tommy Viator and spiraling harmonic streaks; the bass is almost invisible. The only things close to a "hook" in the album are the solos proffered by James Murphy. The vocalist, Bryan Cegon proves himself —according to Eduardo Rivadavia from Allmusic— a perfectly competent but rather average death metal vocalist —both in terms of his death growl and lyrics, that hold an originality from most death metal records. Dreams of the Carrion Kind displays riffs that Murphy intended to use for the songwriting process of Obituary's sophomore album, Cause of Death.

Critical reception

Eduardo Rivadavia from Allmusic gave the album 4.5 stars of 5 calling it "state-of-the-art death metal in the eyes of most enthusiasts of the genre." He particularly praised the songs "Stench of Paradise Burning," "Beyond the Flesh," "Soul Erosion," "Deadspawn," and "Confine of Shadows." According to him the records' apparent intellectual demands invariably restrict Dreams of the Carrion Kind to a very specific fan base and point in time.

Track listing

Credits

Band
James Murphy – Lead, rhythm and acoustic guitars, bass
Bryan Cegon – Vocals
Jason Carman – Rhythm guitar
Tommy Viator – Drums

Additional personnel
Peter Coleman – Keyboards, engineering, sampling
Chris Gehringer – Mastering
Tim Hubbard – Photography
Dave McKean – Artwork, design, illustrations
Colin Richardson – Production, mixing
Aaron Stainthorpe – Vocals
John Walker – Vocals

References

Disincarnate albums
1993 debut albums
Albums with cover art by Dave McKean